The International Medical Informatics Association (IMIA) is an independent organization that plays a role in promoting and furthering the application of information science in modern society, particularly in the fields of healthcare, bioscience and medicine. It was established in 1967 as a technical committee of the International Federation for Information Processing (IFIP). It became an independent organization in 1987 and was established under Swiss law in 1989.

Goals and objectives 
 the promotion of informatics in health care and biomedical research
 the advancement of international cooperation
 the stimulation of research, development and education
 the dissemination and exchange of information

Inherent in this mission is to bring together, from a global perspective, scientists, researchers, vendors, consultants and suppliers in an environment of cooperation and sharing. The international membership network of national member societies, IMIA regions, corporate and academic institutional members, and working and special interest groups, constitute the "IMIA family".

IMIA organizes various conferences and events around the world and is currently focusing on "bridging the knowledge gap" by facilitating and providing support to developing nations. Specific goals include supporting the ongoing development of the African Region.

Code of Ethics for Health Information Professionals 
The International Medical Informatics Association approved the endorsement of the IMIA Code of Ethics for Health Information Professionals at its General Assembly meeting on October 4, 2002, in Taipei. The code is the culmination of several years of a global collaborative effort led by IMIA's working Group on Data Protection in Health Information, Chaired by Professor Ab Baker.

In 2016, the General Assembly approved an updated version of the Code of Ethics, which was authored by Dr. Eike-Henner W. Kluge, Professor of the Department of Philosophy at the University of Victoria in Victoria, BC, Canada

Membership 
IMIA membership consists of Society, Academic and Corporate Institutional and Affiliate Members and Honorary Fellows.

Society Members 
 American Medical Informatics Association (AMIA)
 Argentine Association of Medical Informatics
 Australian Institute of Digital Health (AIDH)
 Working Group Medical Informatics (AKMI) of the Austrian Society for Biomedical Engineering (ÖGBMT) and of the Austrian Computer Society (OCG)
 Belgian Medical Informatics Association
 Brazilian Society of Health Informatics
 British Computer Society Health Informatics Forum 
 Digital Health Canada
 Croatian Society for Medical Informatics
 Cuban Society of Medical Informatics
 Czech Society for Biomedical Engineering and Medical Informatics
 Finnish Social and Health Informatics Association (FinnSHIA)
 French Medical Informatics Association (AIM)
 German Association for Medical Informatics, Biometry and Epidemiology
 Greek Health Informatics Association
 Hong Kong Society of Medical Informatics
 John von Neumann Computer Society (Hungary)
 Indian Association for Medical Informatics
 Iranian Medical Informatics Association 
 Healthcare Informatics Society of Ireland
 The Israeli Association for Medical informatics
 Ivorian Society of Biosciences and Health Informatics (ISBHI)
 Japan Association for Medical Informatics
 Korea Society of Medical Informatics (KOSMI)
 Medical Informatics Association of Malawi (MIAM)
 Malaysian Health Informatics Association (MHIA)
 The Mali Society of Biomedical and Health Information (SOMBIS)
 Health Informatics New Zealand 
 Association for Health Informatics of Nigeria (AHIN)
 Norwegian Society for Medical Informatics
 Philippine Medical Informatics Society, Inc.
 Romanian Society of Medical Informatics
 The Saudi Association for Health Informatics (SAHI)
 Association for Medical and Bio-Informatics, Singapore (AMBIS)
 Slovak Society of Biomedical Engineering and Medical Informatics
 Slovenian Medical Informatics Association (SIMIA)
 South African Health Informatics Association
 Spanish Society of Health Informatics
 Swedish Federation for Medical Informatics
 Swiss Society for Medical Informatics
 Taiwan Association for Medical Informatics (TAMI)
 VMBI, Society for Healthcare Informatics (Netherlands)
 Turkish Medical Informatics Association (TURKMIA)
 The Ukrainian Association for Computer Medicine (UACM)

Official Publications of the International Medical Informatics Association 
IMIA Yearbook (Schattauer Publishers Stuttgart)
ACI - Applied Clinical Informatics (Thieme Group)
Informatics for Health and Social Care (Taylor & Francis)
International Journal of Medical Informatics (Elsevier)
Methods of Information in Medicine (Thieme Group)
BMJ Health & Care Informatics (British Medical Journal)

Working and special interest groups 
The IMIA family includes a growing number of Working and Special Interest Groups, which consist of individuals who share common interests in a particular focal field. The groups hold Working Conferences on leading edge and timely health and medical informatics issues.

IMIA Working Groups and Special Interest Groups include:

 Accident & Emergency Informatics
 Data Mining and Big Data Analytics
 Dental Informatics 
 Ethics, Privacy and Security in Health Informatics
 Exposome Informatics
 Francophone Special Interest Group
 Health and Medical Informatics Education 
 Health Informatics for Development 
 Health Informatics for Patient Safety
 Health Information Systems (HIS)
 Health Record Banking 
 History of BioMedical and Health Informatics 
 Human Factors Engineering for Health Informatics
 Language and Meaning in Biomedicine
 Nursing Informatics Special Interest Group - IMIA NI SIG
 One Digital Health
 Open Source Health Informatics
 Organizational and Social Issues 
 Participatory Health and Social Media
 Primary Health Care Informatics 
 Smart Homes & Ambient Assisted Living
 Standards in Health Care Informatics
 Student & Emerging Professionals SIG
 Technology Assessment & Quality Development in Health Informatics (WG 15)
 Telehealth

See also
 European Federation for Medical Informatics (EFMI)
 ISO TC 215
 MedInfo

References

International organisations based in Switzerland
Health informatics and eHealth associations